Dehn is a surname. Notable people with this surname include:

 Adolf Dehn (1895–1968), American lithographer
 Angelina Dehn (born 1995), aka Ängie, Swedish singer
 Günther Dehn (1882–1970), German theologian
 Lili Dehn (1888–1963), Russian writer
 Max Dehn (1878–1952), German-American mathematician
 Megan Dehn (born 1974), now Megan Anderson, Australian netballer
 Mura Dehn (1905–1987), American filmmaker
 Olive Dehn (1914–2007), English children's writer and poet
 Paul Dehn (1912–1976), British screenwriter
 Raymond Dehn (born 1957), American politician
 Siegfried Dehn (1777–1858), German musicologist
 Virginia Dehn (1922–2005), American painter
 Werner Dehn (1889–1960), German rower

See also 
 Dehne
 Dehns

Surnames from given names